Deh Now-e Sheykh Ali Khan (also Romanized as Deh Now-e Sheykh ʿAlī Khān; also known as Deh-e Shūr, Deh Now-e Āb Shūr, and Deh Shūr) is a village in Posht Rud Rural District, in the Central District of Narmashir County, Kerman Province, Iran. At the 2006 census, its population was 163, with 41 families.

References 

Populated places in Narmashir County